This is the discography of British singer Barbara Dickson.

Albums

Studio albums

Live albums

Compilation albums

Cast recording albums

EPs

Singles

References

Discographies of British artists
Pop music discographies